Nancy Tinari (née Rooks, born 13 June 1959) is a Canadian former long-distance runner. She won the silver medal at the 1987 World 15km Road Race Championships behind Ingrid Kristiansen. Her time of 48:53 still stands as the Canadian record. She also won a silver medal at the 1987 Pan American Games, and represented Canada at the 1988 Seoul Olympics.  Tinari continued competing into her forties, including finishing second at the 2000 Canadian 10 km Road Race Championships aged 41 and winning the Canadian Masters Cross Country title in November 2008 aged 49.

Personal bests
10,000 metres – 32:14.05 (September 1988)
10 km road – 32:14 (April 1988)
15 km road – 48:53 (November 1987)
Half-marathon – 72:50 (November 1991)
Marathon – 2:40:50 (October 1983)

International competitions

References

1959 births
Living people
Canadian female long-distance runners
Athletes (track and field) at the 1988 Summer Olympics
Olympic track and field athletes of Canada
Athletes (track and field) at the 1978 Commonwealth Games
Athletes (track and field) at the 1986 Commonwealth Games
Commonwealth Games competitors for Canada
Athletes (track and field) at the 1987 Pan American Games
Pan American Games silver medalists for Canada
Pan American Games medalists in athletics (track and field)
World Athletics Championships athletes for Canada
Medalists at the 1987 Pan American Games